François "Frantz" Heldenstein (May 15, 1892 – March 27, 1975) was a Luxembourgian sculptor. He was born in Colmar-Berg and died in Luxembourg. In 1924 he won a silver medal in the art competitions of the Olympic Games for his "Vers l'olympiade" ("Toward the Olympic Games").

References

External links
 profile

1892 births
1975 deaths
Luxembourgian sculptors
Olympic silver medalists in art competitions
Luxembourgian artists
20th-century Luxembourgian sculptors
Olympic competitors in art competitions
Medalists at the 1924 Summer Olympics